Shahrak-e Emam Khomeyni (also Romanized as Shahrak-e Emām Khomeynī) is a village in Mianrud Rural District, Chamestan District, Nur County, Mazandaran Province, Iran. At the 2006 census, its population was 271, in 63 families.

References 

Populated places in Nur County